Petruma is a medium-sized lake in the Vuoksi main catchment area. It is located in the region of Southern Savonia in Finland. The name Petruma means also the nearby village in the municipality of Heinävesi.

See also
List of lakes in Finland

References

Lakes of Heinävesi